Lagenandra bogneri belongs to the genus Lagenandra in the family Araceae that is endemic to south western Sri Lanka.

References

External links
  Lagenandra index
  Isotype of Lagenandra bogneri de Wit [family ARACEAE]

bogneri
Flora of Sri Lanka
Plants described in 1978